Command Control (also called CMD CTRL) is an annual, multi-day summit organized by Messe München that focuses primarily on cybersecurity topics. The event was organized for the first time in 2018. The next summit was supposed to take place in Munich from March 3 to March 4, 2020. However, the corona crisis led to the cancellation of Command Control in 2020. In addition, Messe München has decided to discontinue Command Control as an independent event.

History 

A survey was commissioned by the organisers before the event took place. This survey showed that every second company in Germany became the target of cyberattacks in 2017. In addition, according to this study, many companies pay too little attention to their employees when defending themselves against cyber threats. The first summit took place from September 20 to September 22, 2018 in Munich (Germany).

An index (Command Control Cybersecurity-Index 2020) was created in 2019 based on surveys. According to the index, 78 percent consider a change of strategy in their company to be necessary when it comes to cyber security. The next Summit will take place from March 3 to March 4, 2020.

Speakers (selection)

See also 

 Cyberattack
 Cybercrime
 Computer security (Cybersecurity)
 Hacker

References

External links 
 Official Website

Computer security conferences